Gian Pietro Ferretti (died 1557) was a Roman Catholic prelate who served as Bishop of Lavello (1550–1554) and Bishop of Milos (1541–1545).

Biography
On 4 February 1541, Gian Pietro Ferretti was appointed during the papacy of Pope Paul III as Bishop of Milos.
He resigned as Bishop of Milos in 1545. 
On 5 March 1550, he was appointed during the papacy of Pope Julius III as Bishop of Lavello.
He resigned as Bishop of Lavello in 1554. 
He died on 7 May 1557.

References

External links and additional sources
 (Chronology of Bishops) 
 (Chronology of Bishops) 
 (Chronology of Bishops) 
 (Chronology of Bishops) 

16th-century Italian Roman Catholic bishops
Bishops appointed by Pope Paul III
Bishops appointed by Pope Julius III
1557 deaths